Timmanna Nayaka was the 15th-century ruler of Chitradurga in India.

References

Indian royalty
People from Chitradurga
History of Karnataka